Michael Sean Moriarty is a South African politician. He served as the chief whip of the Democratic Alliance (DA) in the Gauteng Provincial Legislature. He was elected to the legislature in 2009 and resigned from it in 2021. He was also the provincial chairperson of the DA in Gauteng. Moriarty was previously a City of Johannesburg municipal councillor.

Moriarty challenged incumbent DA Federal Council Chairperson Helen Zille at the party's Federal Congress in 2020. Zille won the election.

Shortly after Mpho Phalatse's election as mayor of Johannesburg, she appointed Moriarty as chief of staff in her office. He resigned from the provincial legislature to take up the position.

References

External links
Michael Moriarty – People's Assembly

Living people
People from Gauteng
Members of the Gauteng Provincial Legislature
People from Johannesburg
Democratic Alliance (South Africa) politicians
Year of birth missing (living people)